Forker is an unincorporated community in southern Linn County, in the U.S. state of Missouri.

The community is on Missouri Route 130 one mile north of the Linn-Chariton county line. The Chicago, Burlington and Quincy Railroad went past the east side of the community.

History
According to tradition, Forker was the name of a railroad official. A variant name was "Boomer Post Office". A post office called Boomer was established in 1883, and remained in operation until 1953.

References

Unincorporated communities in Linn County, Missouri
Unincorporated communities in Missouri